The University of Community Health, Magway (UCH) is a  Community Health University under the Ministry of Health (Myanmar), and located in Magway city ,  Myanmar. The university offers a four-year Bachelor of Community Health (B.Comm.H) degree program. Students have to study how to perform community health. Also, they must take clinical subjects as integration for rural population whom can't get primary health care. Formally, the graduates are allowed to practice as Health Assistants (HA) in Department of Public Health and FDA of Myanmar, many of whom are the main providers of primary health care in rural Myanmar where access to regular physicians is difficult.

First, it was established as Health Assistant’s training school in Yangon in 1951. Health Assistant’s training school and Aung San Health Demonstration Unit (Field Department) were combined and emerged as School of Health Science for Basic Health Workers in December 1991 that was upgraded up to University of Community Health in 1996. The University moved to Magway in 2000. Field Department was also moved to Tawsaint village, Salin Township in 2006.

Nowadays, most of the alumni are working in various sectors such as NGOs, INGOs, UN, Department of Food and Drug Administration and Department of Public Health of Myanmar Government.

History
With the guidance and national health policy of U Nu's Government the Health Assistant Training School was established in 1951 in Yangon to provide health care to rural population where access to regular medical doctors are difficult. The main objective of that training school is to produce the health assistant within a short time (three years) while the medical doctors were trained for six year. Later, The school was moved a few kilometers north to Insein in 1963, and then to Hlegu in 1968. In 1989, the school came under the purview of the Ministry of Health. The school became the Institute of Community Health in 1991, and became a university in 1995 and began offering a four-year bachelor's degree program. The objective of the university of community health is also change and wide scope. In 1999, the military government moved the school out of Yangon Division to Upper Myanmar. UCH is located on a 41.4-hectare campus at Htonpauk, about 14.5 km north of Magway, and 3.2 km off the Magway-Natmauk Road.

University of Community Health, Magway regularly accepts approximately 150 students (Male: Female = 70:30) who passed the matriculation examination. The required score for selection is approximately 450 for males and 470 for females.

Academic departments
 Department of Biomedical Science
 Department of Community Health
 Department of Disease Control/Epidemiology
 Department of Health Promotion/Health Education
 Department of Environmental Health
 Department of Educational Science
 Department of Myanmar
 Department of English
 Department of Zoology
 Department of Botany
 Department of Chemistry
 Department of Physics
 Department of Field Research (Salin Township, Taw Saint village)

Curriculum
Each school year lasts ten months from January to October. Students are required to take written, practical, field trip and oral exams at the end of each year.

First year

Coursework with assignment
 Biomedical Science
 Zoology                                                                                                          
 Botany                                                                                                           
 Chemistry                                                                                                   
 Physics                                                                                                       
 Communication science
 Myanmar language                                                                                                 
 English language                                                                                                        
 Primary Medical Care
 Myanmar Traditional Medicine                                                                                
 First Aid

Coursework with or without assignment
 Total Personal Professional Development (TPPD)
 Basic Computer

Second year

Coursework with assignment
 Structure and Function of Human Body/Human Anatomy and Physiology 
 Vital Statistics
 General Pathology and Pharmacology
 Epidemiology

Coursework without assignment
 Health Education

Third year
Third year students are required to make field trips to nearby villages and provide seminars on such health education topics as the natural history of diseases, environmental sanitation, the dangers of smoking/alcohol, rodent control, disaster management and global warming, etc. The seminars are organized by the departments of Health Education, Community Health and Environmental Health. The students then visit a local Rural Health Center (RHC) to learn the operations of an RHC.

Coursework with assignment
 Disease Control
 Health Education 
 Environmental Health
Educational  Science

Coursework without assignment
 Medicine 
 Surgery 
 Community Health
 Research Methodology

Fourth year
   Fourth year students need to make research for protocol. For this we had to go to Rural Health Center, under Magway Region (from October  to November).

Coursework with assignment
 Community Health I
 Community Health II 
 Research Methodology
 Medicine 
 Surgery
 Research

Affiliated teaching hospitals
Students are required to study bedside lecture at the following UCH affiliated hospitals in the region for three months(May–July).
 Pakokku General Hospital
 Nyaung U General Hospital
 Meiktila General Hospital
 Field Trip (8 weeks) to rural health center (RHC) for research paper

Graduate Program

The university offers a range of  Master of Community Health (M.Comm.H) degree program in 2017.

See also
University of Public Health, Yangon
Ministry of Health

References

External links
 List of Universities registered under WHO
 http://www.uch.gov.mm

Educational institutions established in 1995
Universities and colleges in Magway Region
Medical schools in Myanmar
Universities and colleges in Myanmar
1995 establishments in Myanmar